Jacob Joseph Lew (born August 29, 1955) is an American attorney and politician who served as the 76th United States Secretary of the Treasury from 2013 to 2017. A member of the Democratic Party, he also served as the 25th White House Chief of Staff from 2012 to 2013 and Director of the Office of Management and Budget in both the Clinton administration and Obama administration.

Born in New York City, Lew earned his A.B. from Harvard College, then a J.D. from Georgetown University Law Center. He began his legal career as a legislative assistant to Representative Joe Moakley, and as a senior policy adviser to former House Speaker Tip O'Neill. Lew then worked as an attorney in private practice before joining Boston's office of management and budget as a deputy. In 1993, he began work for the Clinton Administration as Special Assistant to the President. In 1994, Lew served as Associate Director for Legislative Affairs and Deputy Director of the Office of Management and Budget, then served as the agency's Director, from 1998 to 2001, then, again, from 2010 to 2012. Following his work in the Clinton administration, Lew became executive vice-president of operations at New York University, serving from 2001 to 2006, then the COO at Citigroup, from 2006 to 2008. During 2009 to 2010, Lew served as the first Deputy Secretary of State for Management and Resources.

On January 10, 2013, during President Barack Obama's second term, Lew was nominated to replace retiring Treasury Secretary Timothy Geithner, was confirmed by the Senate February 27, 2013, and then sworn in on the following day, serving until the conclusion of the Obama administration. Lew was succeeded as Secretary of the Treasury by Steven Mnuchin. Since 2017, he has been a managing partner at Lindsay Goldberg, a private equity firm headquartered in New York City. He is currently a visiting professor at the School of International and Public Affairs of Columbia University.

Early life, education, and early career
Lew was born in New York City, the son of Ruth (nee Turoff) and Irving Lew. His family is Jewish. He attended New York City public schools, graduating from Forest Hills High School. His father was a lawyer and rare book dealer who came to the United States from Poland as a child. Lew attended Carleton College in Minnesota for a year, where his faculty adviser was Paul Wellstone, who eventually represented Minnesota in the U.S. Senate. He graduated from Harvard College in 1978 and the Georgetown University Law Center in 1983.

He worked as an aide to Rep. Joe Moakley (D-Mass.) from 1974 to 1975. In 1979, he was a senior policy adviser to House Speaker Tip O'Neill. Under O'Neill he served at the House Democratic Steering and Policy Committee as Assistant Director and then Executive Director, and was responsible for work on domestic and economic issues including Social Security, Medicare, budget, tax, trade, appropriations, and energy issues.

Lew practiced as an attorney for five years as a partner at Van Ness Feldman and Curtis. His practice dealt primarily with electric power generation. He has also worked as Executive Director of the Center for Middle East Research, Issues Director for the Democratic National Committee's Campaign 88, and Deputy Director of the Office of Program Analysis in the city of Boston's Office of Management and Budget.

Clinton administration
From February 1993 to 1994, Lew served as Special Assistant to the President under Bill Clinton. Lew was responsible for policy development and the drafting of the national service initiative (AmeriCorps) and health care reform legislation.

Lew left the White House in October 1994 to work as OMB's Executive Associate Director and Associate Director for Legislative Affairs. From August 1995 until July 1998, Lew served as Deputy Director of OMB. There, Lew was chief operating officer responsible for day-to-day management of a staff of 500. He had crosscutting responsibilities to coordinate Clinton administration efforts on budget and appropriations matters.  He frequently served as a member of the Administration negotiating team, including regarding the Balanced Budget Act of 1997.

President Clinton nominated Lew to be Director of the OMB, and the United States Senate confirmed him for that job on July 31, 1998. He served in that capacity until the end of the Clinton administration in January 2001. As OMB Director, Lew had the lead responsibility for the Clinton Administration's policies on budget, management, and appropriations issues. As a member of the Cabinet and senior member of the economic team, he advised the President on a broad range of domestic and international policies. He represented the Administration in budget negotiations with Congress and served as a member of the National Security Council.

Between Clinton and Obama tenures
After leaving public office in the Clinton administration, Lew served as the Executive Vice President for Operations at New York University and was a Clinical Professor of Public Administration at NYU's Wagner School of Public Service. While at NYU, Lew aided the university in ending graduate students' collective bargaining rights. The Obama administration has maintained that Lew supports workers' union rights. According to a 2004 report in NYU's student newspaper, the Washington Square News, Lew was paid $840,339 during the 2002-2003 academic year. In addition, the university forgave several hundred thousand dollars in mortgage loans it made to Lew.

In June 2006, Lew was named chief operating officer of Citigroup's Alternative Investments unit, a proprietary trading group. The unit he oversaw invested in a hedge fund "that bet on the housing market to collapse." During his work at Citigroup, Lew had invested heavily in funds in Ugland House while he worked as an investment banker at Citigroup during the 2008 financial meltdown. Lew also had oversight of Citigroup subsidiaries in countries including, Bermuda, the Cayman Islands, and Hong Kong; and during his time at Citigroup, Citigroup subsidiaries in the Cayman Islands increased to 113.

Lew co-chaired the Advisory Board for City Year New York. He is a member of the Council on Foreign Relations, the Brookings Institution Hamilton Project Advisory Board, and the National Academy of Social Insurance. Lew is also a member of the bar in Massachusetts and the District of Columbia.

Obama administration

Deputy Secretary of State

As Deputy Secretary of State for Management and Resources, Lew was the State Department's chief operating officer and was primarily responsible for resource issues, while James Steinberg, who also served as Deputy Secretary of State during that period was responsible for policy.  Lew was co-leader of the State Department's Quadrennial Diplomacy and Development Review.

Budget director
On July 13, 2010, the White House announced that Lew had been chosen to replace Peter Orszag as Director of the Office of Management and Budget (OMB), subject to Senate confirmation. During confirmation hearings in the Senate, in response to questioning by Senator Bernie Sanders (I-VT), Lew said that he did not believe deregulation was a "proximate cause" of the financial crisis of 2007–2008: Lew told the panel that "the problems in the financial industry preceded deregulation," and after discussing those issues, added that he didn't "personally know the extent to which deregulation drove it, but I don't believe that deregulation was the proximate cause."

On November 18, 2010, Lew was confirmed by the Senate by unanimous consent.

The $3.7 trillion 2011 budget President Obama unveiled the administration estimated reductions to federal spending deficits by $1.1 trillion over the next decade if adopted and economic assumptions were fully achieved. Two-thirds of that estimated reduction would come from spending cuts through a 5-year freeze in discretionary spending first announced in Obama's 2011 State of the Union address, as well as savings to mandatory programs such as Medicare and lower interest payments on the debt that would result from the lower spending. Tax increases are responsible for the other third of the reduction, including a cap on itemized reductions for wealthier taxpayers and the elimination of tax breaks for oil and gas companies. Economist and former financial fraud investigator William K. Black warned that the OMB budget statement prepared under Lew's direction was "an ode to austerity," and that austerity would force the U.S. economy back into recession.

In an op-ed in the Huffington Post, Lew cited top Administration priorities to achieve deficit reduction; including: $400 billion in savings from non-security discretionary spending freezes, $78 billion in cuts to the Department of Defense, returning to the Clinton-era tax rates for the top 2% of income earners, and lowering the Corporate tax from 35% to 25%.

Chief of Staff
On January 9, 2012, President Obama announced that Lew would replace William M. Daley as White House Chief of Staff. Lew's nomination was followed with criticism after renewed reports that he received over $900,000 in bonuses while working at Citigroup, which had been rescued with $45 billion from the Troubled Asset Relief Program (TARP) after losing $27.7 billion, or 90% of its value.

During his tenure as chief of staff, Lew was seen as a supporter and top negotiator for a "grand bargain" deal between President Obama and House Speaker John Boehner, to avoid "Fiscal cliff" sequester cuts and tax increases.

Secretary of the Treasury

On January 10, 2013, President Obama nominated Lew for the position of Secretary of the Treasury. The nomination became the subject of some humorous commentary, due to Lew's unusual loopy signature, which would have appeared on all U.S. paper currency for the duration of his tenure; the signature generated enough media attention that Obama joked at a press conference that he had considered rescinding his nomination when he learned of it. Lew later adopted a more conventional signature for currency. The Senate Finance Committee held confirmation hearings for Lew on February 13, 2013, and approved his nomination 19–5 on February 26, 2013, sending his nomination to the full Senate.

During his confirmation hearings before the United States Senate Committee on Finance, Republican Senator Chuck Grassley expressed concern that Lew did not know what Ugland House was, though he had invested in it. Lew had invested heavily in funds in Ugland House, while he worked as an investment banker at Citigroup during the 2008 financial meltdown. Lew had taken advantage of current tax law, and his financial allocation in the venture resulted in Lew taking roughly a 2.8% loss, a $1,582 decrease in his investment principal.

On February 27, 2013, the full Senate voted and approved Lew for Secretary of the Treasury 71–26. He was sworn into office on February 28.

In December 2013, Lew said that the government might run out of cash to pay the country's bills by late February or early March 2014. That set up yet another showdown in Congress over raising or suspending the debt limit, a statutory limit on the total amount of United States borrowing, early in the year. "The creditworthiness of the United States is an essential underpinning of our strength as a nation; it is not a bargaining chip to be used for partisan political ends", Mr. Lew said in the letter. "Increasing the debt limit does not authorize new spending commitments. It simply allows the government to pay for expenditures Congress has already approved."

In May 2014, Lew received an Honorary Doctorate of Humane Letters from Georgetown University, and spoke at the first commencement ceremony of the McCourt School of Public Policy.

In 2016, a fictionalized version of Lew appeared in the 2016 episodes "eps2.0_unm4sk-pt2.tc" and "eps2.9_pyth0n-pt1.p7z" in Season 2 of the series Mr. Robot.

Personal life
Lew married his high school sweetheart, Ruth Schwartz. As Chief of Staff, Lew commuted to Washington from the couple's home in the Riverdale neighborhood of the Bronx, New York City. They have two grown children, one of whom is Shoshana Lew, head of the Colorado Department of Transportation.

Lew is an Orthodox Jew who observes the Jewish Shabbat and has attended Beth Sholom Congregation in Potomac, Maryland, TheShul of the Nation's Capital  and Kesher Israel Congregation in Washington, D. C., and the Hebrew Institute of Riverdale in the Bronx, New York. Interviewed in a 2010 article, Lew's former boss on the National Security Council, Sandy Berger, commented that "Lew's faith never got in the way of performing his duties". A 2011 press release from the Religion News Service noted that Lew also "has extensive connections in the American Jewish community", and that he might be able to help President Obama "build a more friendly rapport" with Israeli Prime Minister Benjamin Netanyahu.

References

External links

 About the Secretary-U.S. Department of the Treasury
 Chief of Staff Jack Lew at The White House
 
 

|-

|-

|-

|-

|-

1955 births
20th-century American politicians
21st-century American politicians
American chief operating officers
American people of Polish-Jewish descent
Carleton College alumni
Citigroup people
Clinton administration personnel
Directors of the Office of Management and Budget
Georgetown University Law Center alumni
Harvard College alumni
Jewish American members of the Cabinet of the United States
Living people 
New York (state) Democrats
New York (state) lawyers
New York University people
New York University faculty
Columbia University faculty
Obama administration cabinet members
Obama administration personnel
Politicians from New York City
United States Deputy Secretaries of State
United States Secretaries of the Treasury
White House Chiefs of Staff
Lawyers from New York City
Forest Hills High School (New York) alumni
Clinton administration cabinet members